DocMagic, Inc. is an American technology company. The company was founded by its current President and CEO, Dominic Iannitti, in 1987 and is headquartered in Torrance, California, USA. DocMagic is based on a software as a service (SaaS) model; DocMagic's principal product, its Document Generation Solution, is a software which allows users such as banks or mortgage brokers to input variables to generate documents used in the mortgage process.

In 2014, DocMagic acquired eSignSystems, another software as a service company which had offered electronic notarization of documents to its users.

DocMagic has since incorporated these technologies into its own services; by 2018, DocMagic had processed more than 300 million signatures using the eSign service.

DocMagic's facility was designed by Rania Alomar Design & Architecture and was recognized by the American Institute of Architects with a 2013 AIA Institute Honor Award for Interior Architecture.

In July 2020, DocMagic, Inc., has collaborated with Simplifile to introduce modern workflow efficiencies that would further digitize the closing phase, including automation after completion.

References

External links
 

American companies established in 1998
Software companies established in 1998
Software companies based in California
Companies based in Torrance, California
Software companies of the United States